The 1931 season was Wisła Krakóws 23rd year as a club.

Friendlies

Ekstraklasa

Squad, appearances and goals

|-
|}

Goalscorers

External links
1931 Wisła Kraków season at historiawisly.pl

Wisła Kraków seasons
Association football clubs 1931 season
Wisla